The Kota Kinabalu Monorail is a proposed monorail line project since 2009 to be constructed in the Kota Kinabalu area by the Sabah state government. The proposals generated mixed reactions between mayor and politicians. As reported in the government website, the project was in the ground breaking process under the Kota Kinabalu development plan.

See also 
 Monorails in Malaysia
 List of monorail systems

References 

Monorails in Malaysia
Proposed rail infrastructure in Malaysia
Proposed monorails